Tegostoma embale is a moth in the family Crambidae. It was described by Aristide Caradja in 1928. It is found in Uralsk, Russia.

References

Odontiini
Moths described in 1928
Moths of Asia
Taxa named by Aristide Caradja